Neyfeld is a rural locality (a village) in Yanyshevsky Selsoviet, Blagovarsky District, Bashkortostan, Russia. The population was 33 as of 2010. There is 1 street.

Geography 
Neyfeld is located 34 km northeast of Yazykovo (the district's administrative centre) by road. Kyzyl-Yulduz is the nearest rural locality.

References 

Rural localities in Blagovarsky District